The following are the national records in Olympic weightlifting in Poland. Records are maintained in each weight class for the snatch lift, clean and jerk lift, and the total for both lifts by the Polski Związek Podnoszenia Ciężarów (PZPC).

Current records

Men

Women

Historical records

Men (1998–2018)

Women (1998–2018)

References
General
Polish records – Men Updated 1 November 2022
Polish records – Women Updated 1 November 2022
Specific

External links
PZPC web site
Historical Polish records – Men
Historical Polish records – Women

records
Poland
Olympic weightlifting
weightlifting